Korpisalo is a Finnish surname. Notable people with the surname include:

Jari Korpisalo (born 1966), Finnish ice hockey player
Joonas Korpisalo (born 1994), Finnish ice hockey player

Finnish-language surnames